Dominic Ludden (born 30 March 1974) is an English former footballer. He played as a defender for several English clubs, including Billericay Town, where he began his career, Leyton Orient, Watford, Preston North End, before finishing his career with unsuccessful spells with Halifax Town and Leigh RMI. Ludden scored within ten minutes of his debut for Leyton Orient vs Huddersfield, this proved to be his only senior goal. He played under David Moyes at Preston and was England Under 18 captain in 1992.

References

1974 births
Living people
Sportspeople from Basildon
English footballers
Association football defenders
Billericay Town F.C. players
Leyton Orient F.C. players
Watford F.C. players
Preston North End F.C. players
Halifax Town A.F.C. players
Leigh Genesis F.C. players
English Football League players
National League (English football) players